Dufftown railway station is a preserved railway station that serves the burgh of Dufftown, Moray, Scotland on the Keith and Dufftown Railway.

History 
The station first opened on 21 February 1862 by the Keith and Dufftown Railway. There was a goods yard to the southwest, which is used for stock shortage nowadays. The station closed on 6 May 1968 to passengers. The line for westbound trains was lifted shortly after. Goods traffic ceased around 1991. In 2003, the Keith and Dufftown Association reopened the station and the line as a preserved railway and set up their headquarters at the station.

References

External links 
 RAILSCOT - Dufftown

Disused railway stations in Moray
Railway stations in Great Britain opened in 1862
Railway stations in Great Britain closed in 1968
Beeching closures in Scotland
Former Great North of Scotland Railway stations
1862 establishments in Scotland